Arthur Wilson Page (September 10, 1883 – September 5, 1960) was a vice president and director of AT&T from 1927 to 1947. He is sometimes referred to as "the father of corporate public relations" for his work at AT&T. The company was experiencing resistance from the public to its monopolization efforts. Page is said to have established a series of public relations heuristics generally referred to as "the Page Principles".

Arthur was born on September 10, 1883 to Walter Hines Page and his wife, Willa A. Page, of Aberdeen, North Carolina. For his secondary education, Arthur studied at Lawrenceville School. He then attended Harvard College, graduating in 1905. He went to work at Doubleday, Page & Co., his father’s company, editing magazines, in particular The World's Work. "He wrote many powerful editorials describing and explaining the special obligations of corporations in a democratic society."

In 1927, Walter S. Gifford hired Page to become vice-president for public relations at AT&T. One of his first assignments was to prepare a speech for President Gifford to present in October that year to the National Association of Railroad and Utilities Commissioners meeting in Dallas, Texas.

In the early 1900s, AT&T had assessed that 90 percent of its press coverage was negative, which was reduced to 60 percent by changing its business practices and disseminating information to the press. According to business historian John Brooks, Page positioned the company as a public utility and increased the public's appreciation for its contributions to society. 

On the other hand, Stuart Ewen wrote that AT&T used its advertising dollars with newspapers to manipulate its coverage and had their public relations team write feature stories that were published as if they were written by independent journalists.

In 1941, when the book The Bell Telephone System by A.W. Page was published, the Dallas speech was quoted in chapter 2: "Responsibility for such a large part of the entire telephone service of the country...imposes on the management an unusual obligation to the public..."

He is today recognized in the name of two organizations, the Arthur W. Page Society, an organization for senior public relations executives, and the Arthur W. Page Center for Integrity in Public Communication, a research center dedicated to the study and advancement of ethics and responsibility in corporate communication.

References

 Noel L. Griese (2001) Arthur W. Page: publisher, public relations pioneer, patriot, Anvil Publishers,  .

AT&T people
1883 births
1960 deaths
American public relations people
Harvard College alumni
Lawrenceville School alumni
Public relations pioneers